The Juan Manuel Valdez Airport or Güiria Airport, formerly known as  Cristóbal Colón Airport,  is an airport serving Güiria, in the state of Sucre in Venezuela.

The Guiria non-directional beacon (Ident: GUI) is located on the field.

See also
Transport in Venezuela
List of airports in Venezuela

References

External links
OurAirports - Güiria
OpenStreetMap - Güiria
SkyVector - Güiria

Airports in Venezuela
Buildings and structures in Sucre (state)